Elections to elect all members of the North West Leicestershire District Council took place on 7 May 2015, simultaneously with a general election, held as one of the English local elections of that year.

At the request of the previous administration, a boundary review took place during 2014 with a view to make every ward represented by one councillor. The total number of councillors remained at 38, meaning that the final proposals from the Local Government Boundary Commission for England replaced 20 single-, double- and triple-member wards with 38,  single-member.

The local Conservative governing group increased their previous majority of two gained at the previous election. The Labour Party were the only other party fielding a full slate of 38 candidates, the first time since the election four council terms ago. Five independent candidates stood, two of whom were successfully returned. Local Liberal Democrats taking in 16 candidates had one councillor before the election, who was returned (re-elected) and made no gains.

In groups or individuals not seeing any councillors returned in this election UKIP fielded their first candidates since 2007, standing in 14 seats. The Green Party stood one candidate in the Kegworth ward.  One candidate from the British Democratic Party presented himself for election.

Results
Note that the changes shown reflect an unchanged council size.  They may be influenced by an unpredictable effect of the Boundary Commission for England aligning electorate size to the extent of wards (the body responsible for updating boundaries on demographic change to avoid the gradual natural onset of malapportionment). This change moved all areas of the district to single-councillor representation.

Ward by ward 

Candidates marked by an asterisk (*) are incumbent councillors. Not all seats are new as some single-member wards have remained unchanged from the previous election.

References

2015
2015 English local elections
May 2015 events in the United Kingdom
2010s in Leicestershire